Maqtu-e Olya (also Romanized as Maqţu‘-e ‘Olyā, and Maqţū‘-e ‘Olyā; also known as Maqţū‘ and Maqţu‘-e Bālā) is a village in Jarahi Rural District, in the Central District of Mahshahr County, Khuzestan Province, Iran. At the 2006 census, its population was 685, in 139 families.

References 

Populated places in Mahshahr County